Jitaurious Tykyvion ‘Ty’ Gordon (born October 20, 1998) is an American professional basketball player for BC Gargždai-SC of the Lithuanian Basketball League (LKL). He played college basketball player for the Northwest Mississippi Rangers, the Troy Trojans and the Nicholls Colonels.

High school career
Gordon attended Horn Lake High School. As a junior, he scored 50 points against Lake Cormorant High School. Gordon averaged 26.2 points per game as a senior.

College career
Gordon began his college career at Northwest Mississippi Community College, where he was a two-time all-conference selection and averaged 20.6 points per game. He transferred to Troy following his sophomore season. Gordon averaged 12.1 points and 3.2 assists per game as a junior. Following the season, he transferred to Nicholls. As a senior, Gordon averaged 14.6 points, 3.6 rebounds, and 3.7 assists per game, earning First-Team All-Southland honors. On February 17, 2022, he scored a career-high 31 points in a 82-73 win against McNeese State. As a fifth-year senior, Gordon averaged 21.4 points, 3.4 rebounds and 3.1 assists per game. He was named the Southland Player of the Year as well as First Team All-Southland.

Professional career

Memphis Hustle (2022)
On October 23, 2022, Gordon joined the Memphis Hustle training camp roster. However, he did not make the final roster.

BC Gargždai (2022–present)
On December 9, 2022, Gordon signed with BC Gargždai-SC of the Lithuanian Basketball League (LKL).

References

External links
Northwest Mississippi Rangers bio
Troy Trojans bio
Nicholls Colonels bio

1998 births
Living people
American expatriate basketball people in Lithuania
American men's basketball players
Basketball players from Mississippi
Northwest Mississippi Community College alumni
Troy Trojans men's basketball players
Nicholls Colonels men's basketball players
Point guards
People from Tunica, Mississippi